The Union Party ( Hizb el ittihad) is a Lebanese political party based in Beqaa Governorate and led by former minister Abdelrahim Mourad. The party is officially secular and its ideology is Nasserism. The party was founded as Resurrect the Revolution, and took on its current name in 1990.

The party is strongly allied with Syria and the March 8 Alliance with support from Iran, Syria and previously Qatar.

The Union Party was represented in Parliament by Abdelrahim Mourad from 1992 to 2009, and from 2018 to 2022 in one of the Sunni seats in West Bekaa-Rashaya. He was succeeded as an MP by his son Hasan Mrad following the 2022 Lebanese general election.

References

External links
 Official website (archive)

Arab nationalism in Lebanon
Nasserist political parties
Nationalist parties in Lebanon
Political parties with year of establishment missing
Secularism in Lebanon
Socialist parties in Lebanon